The 2018–19 UT Arlington Mavericks men's basketball team represented the University of Texas at Arlington during the 2018–19 NCAA Division I men's basketball season. The Mavericks, led by first-year head coach Chris Ogden, played their home games at the College Park Center as members of the Sun Belt Conference. They finished the season 17–16, 12–6 in Sun Belt play to finish a three-way tie for second place. As the No. 2 seed in the Sun Belt tournament, they defeated Georgia Southern in the semifinals before losing to Georgia State in the championship.

Previous season
The Mavericks finished the 2017–18 season 21–13, 10–8 in Sun Belt play to finish in fourth place. They defeated Appalachian State and Louisiana to advance to the championship game of the Sun Belt tournament where they lost to Georgia State. Despite having 21 wins, they did not participate in a postseason tournament.

On March 26, 2018, head coach Scott Cross was fired after 12 seasons at UT Arlington, along with his entire staff, with UTA's Athletic Director citing a change in the program's leadership. On April 6, the school hired former Texas Tech assistant Chris Ogden as head coach.

Roster

Schedule and results

|-
!colspan=12 style=| Non-conference regular season

|-
!colspan=12 style=| Sun Belt Conference regular season

|-
!colspan=9 style=| Sun Belt tournament

-->

References

2017-18
2018–19 Sun Belt Conference men's basketball season
2018 in sports in Texas
2019 in sports in Texas